Barry Railway Class A were the first steam tank engines to be built for the Barry Railway in South Wales and had an  wheel arrangement.  They were designed by John Wolfe Barry and built by Sharp Stewart.

Traffic duties 
The locomotive was primarily intended for heavy shunting duties at Barry Docks and Nos. 1-4 were delivered to Barry for that purpose.  One locomotive, No. 5 was the first to be delivered to Treforest Junction where it hauled the Engineer's Saloon at the northern end of the line; the through line to the docks not yet being completed.  To perform this duty, No. 5 was fitted with a vacuum injector and train pipes.  Because of this, No.5 had the honour of hauling the first passenger train between Barry Docks and Cogan when the line opened on 20 December 1888.  The following year, the Class C locomotives arrived and were specifically designed for passenger traffic.  At which point, the vacuum brake fittings were removed and No. 5 was sent to work with the other 4 locomotives of the class in the docks.

Withdrawal 

All five locomotives passed to the Great Western Railway in 1922.  No. 1 (GWR 699) was withdrawn in April 1931 and sold to Coltness Iron Co Ltd in June 1932; it was cut up on site in March 1962.  No. 2 (GWR 700) was withdrawn in October 1926 and sold to Guest, Keen Nettlefolds at Dowlais Steelworks in October 1927; it was scrapped in August 1950.  No. 4 (GWR 703) was withdrawn in May 1932 and sold to Ocean Coal Co Ltd at Lady Windsor Colliery in Ynysybwl; it was scrapped in 1956.  No. 3 (GWR 702) was withdrawn in April 1931 and placed on the sales list though never sold.  No. 5 (GWR 706) was withdrawn in November 1930 but not offered for sale.  None has been preserved.

Numbering

References 

A
0-6-0T locomotives
Sharp Stewart locomotives
Standard gauge steam locomotives of Great Britain
Railway locomotives introduced in 1888
Scrapped locomotives
Shunting locomotives